Philipp Bedrosovich Kirkorov PAR (born 30 April 1967) is a Bulgarian-born Russian pop singer. He is a five-time winner of the "Best Selling Russian Artist" title at the World Music Awards ceremonies.

Biography 
Philipp Kirkorov was born on 30 April 1967 in Varna, Bulgaria. His father, Bedros Kirkorov, is a Bulgarian-born singer of Armenian descent. 

In 1990, Kirkorov won the Grand Prix in the competition "Shlyager-90" (Hit-90) in Leningrad with the song "Nebo i Zemlya" (Sky and Earth). In 1992, his music video to the song "Atlantida" was selected as "Music Video of the Year". His popularity began to spread outside of Russia and he toured in the United States, Canada, Germany, and Israel.

In 1994, he proposed to Alla Pugacheva and she accepted. On 13 January the couple announced their engagement in Moscow. On 15 March the marriage was registered in St. Petersburg by then-mayor Anatoly Sobchak. On 15 May the wedding of Kirkorov and Pugacheva took place in Jerusalem. Kirkorov represented Russia in the Eurovision Song Contest 1995 held in Dublin with the song "Kolybelnaya dlya vulkana" ('Lullaby for the volcano') and finished in 17th place. He co-wrote the Belarusian entry at the Eurovision Song Contest 2007, "Work Your Magic" for Dmitry Koldun, wrote the 2008 Ukrainian entry "Shady Lady", performed by Ani Lorak, and also co-composed Moldova's Eurovision entry for the  contest, "Sugar", which was performed by Natalia Gordienko. He was also a judge in the second season of Music Idol in Bulgaria. Kirkorov makes a cameo in Verka Serduchka's video "Do Re Mi". Other than his native Bulgarian, he is fluent in Russian, and is proficient in Spanish and English.

In December 2012 he signed an open letter criticizing a St. Petersburg bill banning "homosexual propaganda", along with pop stars like Dima Bilan and Valery Syutkin.

In January 2023, Ukraine imposed sanctions on Philipp for his support of 2022 Russian invasion of Ukraine.

Public image and controversies

Kirkorov has maintained a "bad boy" public image for most of his career and has caused a number of media controversies.

The most notorious scandal followed an incident in Rostov-on-Don on 20 May 2004. At a press conference he insulted (using Russian obscene language) Irina Aroyan, a female journalist who had asked why so many of his songs were covers of American and European hits. During the ensuing discussion, Kirkorov eventually told Aroyan that he was "tired of her pink blouse, her tits, and her microphone" and demanded that she leave the room immediately. When she eventually did, his bodyguards attacked her outside and destroyed her tape recorder.  The incident led to a major response and discussions in the mass media. On 11 August 2004, Kirkorov was found guilty of insults (article 130 of the Russian penal code) and was fined 60,000 rubles (about 2000 US dollars at the time).

At a pro-Viktor Yanukovych candidacy concert during the 2004 Ukrainian presidential election Kirkorov's father, Bulgarian singer Bedros Kirkorov, mistakenly called on Ukrainians to vote for the opposing candidate Viktor Yushchenko – to wild cheers from the audience.

There was also an incident where Kirkorov sent his guards to attack the Russian rock singer and DDT band frontman Yuri Shevchuk after their emotional skirmish in a public place (as known, Shevchuk keeps no guards of his own). The reason for the argument reportedly were Shevchuk's offensive statements against Kirkorov, his wife, and his alleged lip-synching.

On 15 May 2009 Kirkorov resigned as head of the Russian jury at the 2009 Eurovision Song Contest, which has a 50% say in who will be national Russian Eurovision representative, after having been seen posing for cameras with Greek entry Sakis Rouvas and having dinner with Norwegian entry Alexander Rybak. Furthermore, Kirkorov admitted that he and Rouvas had been personal friends for years. Since the integrity of the jury was deemed damaged, Kirkorov had little option but to resign once these stories had been made public.

On 3 September 2009 Philipp Kirkorov, clad in his (in)famous 2008 Music Awards 'gold' suit was caught on camera while 'confiscating' the camera belonging to journalist Veronica Kozlova. Since the act could have been interpreted according to the law as a robbery, some reports said the singer was facing 2 to 7 years' imprisonment and a heavy fine. All charges were dropped, however, and Kirkorov stated that his actions were 'provoked' by the journalist. Kozlova was immediately dubbed 'Pink Blouse the Second' by her colleagues and other journalists.

Another incident occurred on 4 December 2010, when he allegedly slapped a female assistant because he was unhappy with the lighting at a concert venue. The woman, later identified as Marina Yablokova, threatened to sue Kirkorov. As a result, Kirkorov fled to Israel and had himself interned at a psychiatric hospital. On 7 December 2010 the singer publicly admitted that he had psychological problems on his official website and apologized to his latest victim.

Russian actor Nikita Dzhigurda during a talk show hinted on non-hetero sexual orientations of several prominent Russian pop stars, including Kirkorov. Dzhigurda concluded with the warning: "Come out! Come out from below ground, before it's too late!"

On 29 November 2016, Russian media reported that Didier Marouani has been detained in Moscow by Russian police on charges of extortion and defamation. The charges were based on a complaint by Kirkorov with whom Marouani had a disagreement regarding a copyright infringement case.

In April 2022, Kirkorov criticized RT editor-in-chief Margarita Simonyan for questioning the sexual orientation of Russian comedian and television presenter Maxim Galkin, who fled Russia in protest of the war in Ukraine.

Support for the Russian annexation of Crimea and invasion of Ukraine 
Due to his public support of the 2014 Russian annexation of Crimea, Lithuania has blacklisted Kirkorov starting from 19 January 2021, meaning the performer will not be able to enter the country for five years. Several of his concerts had been scheduled in Lithuanian cities that year. On 23 June 2021 Kirkorov was included in the list of "persons who pose a threat to Ukraine's national security" and was thus banned from entering Ukraine for speaking in support of Russia's annexation of Crimea. Estonia banned the singer from entering the country in 2022, following 24. February 2022.

In January 2023 Ukraine imposed sanctions on him for promoting Russia during the 2022 Russian invasion of Ukraine.

Honours and awards

Orders
 Order of Honor (30 April 2017) -  for great contribution to the development of national music art and many years of creative activity.
 Order of Francesc Skarina (Belarus, 18 May 2012) - For a significant personal contribution to the development and strengthening of Belarusian-Russian cultural ties, high performing skills.

Titles
Order of Francysk Skaryna (18 May 2012)
People's Artist of Russia Federation (12 February 2008)
People's Artist of Ukraine  (29 May 2008)
Merited Artist of the Russian Federation (2001)
 People's Artist of Chechnya (2006)
 People's Artist of Ingushetia (2006)
 Honorary Citizen of Yalta (2010)
 Honored Art Activist of Autonomous Republic of Crimea (2000)
 Goodwill ambassador of United Nations (2000)

Medals
Medal "10 years of Astana" (Kazakhstan, 2008)

Public awards
 Record holder of the Russian Book of Records (2017)

|-
! colspan="3" style="background: cyan;" | World Music Awards
|-

|-
! colspan="3" style="background: cyan;" | World Music Awards
|-

|-
! colspan="3" style="background: cyan;" | World Music Awards
|-

Discography

Albums
Studio albums
1990: Philipp
1990: Sinbat-Morehod
1991: Nebo I Zemlya
1991: Ti, Ti, Ti
1992: Takoi Sakoi
1994: Ya Ne Raphael
1995: Primadonna
1995: Ckazi Solncu – "Da"
1998: Edinstvenaya
1998: Oi, Mama Shika Dam
2000: Chelofilia
2001: Magico Amor
2002: Vlubloniy I Bezumno Odinokiy
2003: Neznakomka
2007: For You
2011: Drugoy – 2 Edition
2016: Ya

Live
2001: Vchera, Segodnya, Zavtra... (Yesterday, Today, Tomorrow... )
Compilation
2003: Luchshie Pesni (The Best Songs)
2004: Dueti (Duets)

Singles
1999: Mish`
2000: Ogon` I Voda
2000: Kilimandzaro
2001: Diva
2001: Ti Poverish`?
2001: Ya Za Tebya Umru
2001: Maria
2002: Zesrokaya Lubov`
2004: Sam P..A?! Ili Kirkorov MAZZDie!!!
2005: Kak Sumashedshiy Ya (duet with Sakis Rouvas)
2009: Zara

Eurovision covers
Philipp Kirkorov has covered a few songs which appeared in the Eurovision Song Contest and its national finals, as well as entering a song in his own right. Songs include:

"Dreamin'" (Ireland 1995 entry) (English and Russian)
"(I Would) Die for You" (Greece 2001 entry) (English and Russian as "Ya za tebya umru")
"Diva" (Israel 1998 entry) (English, Hebrew, Spanish and Russian)
"Go" (United Kingdom 1988 entry) (Russian as "Lish by ty vsegda byla moej")
"Maria Magdalena" (Croatia 1999 entry) (Russian) 
"Hero" – Charlotte Perrelli (2008 Swedish entry) (Russian as "Novyj geroj")
"La voix" – Malena Ernman (2009 Swedish entry) (Russian as "Golos", English and French) (with Anna Netrebko)
"Let's get wild" – Helena Paparizou (2005 Greek National Final) (Russian as "Kaif")
"Carnaval" – DJ Mendez (2002 Swedish National Final) (Russian)
"Let your spirit fly" – Jan Johansson & Pernilla Wahlgren (2003 Swedish National Final) (Russian as "Vljublennaja dusha") (with Anastasia Stotskaya)
"Cara Mia" – Måns Zelmerlöw (2007 Swedish National Final) (Russian as "Koroleva")
"Playing with Fire" – Paula and Ovi (Romania 2010 entry) (Russian as "Igra s ognem")
"Hope & Glory" – Måns Zelmerlöw (2009 Swedish National Final) (Russian as "Tyi vsyo uvidish sam")

Videos

Filmography 
 1995: "Old Songs About Main Things" (as magician from south)
 1996: "Old Songs About Main Things – 2" (as Mr. Singer)
 1997: "Old Songs About Main Things – 3" (as young actor)
 2000: "Salon of Beaty" (as Evgeniy Slavin)
 2000: "Old Songs About Main Things.Postscript" (as magician from south)
 2001: "Como El Cine" (as himself)
 2002: "Evenings on a Farm Near Dikanka" (as devil)
 2003: "Crazy Day or The Marriage of Figaro" (as Count Almaviva)
 2006: "The Adventures of Verka Serduchka" (cameo)
 2007: "Kingdom of Crooked Mirrors" (as kite Piliph)
 2007: "Stars Holidays" (as Baron Ctar, intergalactic star)
 2008: "Goldfish" (as star groom)
 2008: "On Back Of Black Cat" (cameo)
 2009: "Love in the Big City" (as Saint Valentin)
 2010: "Love in the Big City 2" (as Saint Valentin)
 2010: "Svaty" (cameo)
 2012: "Little Red Riding Hood" (As Cat Basilio)
 2014: "Love in the Big City 3" (as Saint Valentin)
 2017: "Naughty Grandma" (cameo)

Eurovision Song Contest entries

Real estate
 Villa in Ostrov Myakinino (Cottage  Village Beresta) near Moscow.
 Villa in La Gorce Dr, Miami Beach.

See also
Russian pop music

References

External links

 
Philipp Kirkorov at the Forbes

Интервью Филиппа Киркорова журналу Rolling Stone

1967 births
Eurovision Song Contest entrants of 1995
Eastern Orthodox Christians from Russia
Eastern Orthodox Christians from Bulgaria
Bulgarian emigrants to the Soviet Union
Bulgarian people of Armenian descent
Living people
Musicians from Varna, Bulgaria
People's Artists of Russia
Recipients of the title of People's Artists of Ukraine
Recipients of the Order of Francysk Skaryna
Eurovision Song Contest entrants for Russia
20th-century Russian singers
21st-century Russian singers
Russian people of Armenian descent
Russian pop singers
World Music Awards winners
Soviet pop singers
Honored Artists of the Russian Federation
Russian record producers
Russian pop musicians
Russian television presenters
20th-century Russian male singers
21st-century Russian male singers
Russian National Music Award winners
Russian people of French descent
Bulgarian people of French descent
Bulgarian people of Russian descent
Russian people of Bulgarian descent
Bulgarian people of Romani descent
Russian Romani people
Winners of the Golden Gramophone Award